Smilodontini is an extinct tribe within the Machairodontinae or "saber-toothed cat" subfamily of the Felidae. The tribe is also known as the "dirk-toothed cats".

As the name suggests, the famous genus of Smilodon is part of this group, but there are also three other distinct genera in Smilodontini. The earliest known genus of the tribe is Promegantereon, once thought to be a species of Paramachairodus. The tribe only became extinct 10,000 years ago, with the demise of Smilodon. All of these are saber-toothed cats, meaning that they have long, narrow upper canines and stocky, well muscled proportions.

Description 
The various members of Smilodontini are generally distinguished by their long, narrow upper canines. However, the stockiness often seen as one of the tribe's signature features varied between the different genera. Promegantereon and Paramachairodus for example, were likely arboreal or at the least, scansorial, given their moderately long tails, large dewclaws and smaller, slender builds. These species also had relatively small upper canines for their size, though they already showed the flat, blade-like edges that defined them as those of machairodonts. Megantereon, a later species, was more intermediate in physiology between these earlier forms and the more cursorial Rhizosmilodon and Smilodon itself, which were better built for life on ground, as well as bringing down relatively larger prey.

Classification

Phylogeny
The phylogenetic relationships of Smilodontini are shown in the following cladogram:

Paleobiology 
Like all machairodonts, smilodontins were equipped to hunt and kill prey in a manner that was seemingly quicker and more efficient than what is seen in modern cats like the pantherinae. Using their elongated canines, smilodontins would aim for the vital spots of the neck or belly (the exact placement of such bites is still hotly debated among experts), killing either by disembowelment of by severing major arteries such as the carotid. The enlarged carnassials would then be used to shear meat from the bones as the cat fed. In regards to feeding habits, the carnassials of Megantereon suggest that it was a loner that fed at leisurely paces in deep bushes or in trees, while Smilodon on the other end of the spectrum, lived in what was probably a highly competitive environment and in addition, seems to have been social, suggesting a need to eat as much as possible without losing a meal to scavengers.

References

 
Machairodontinae
Mammal tribes